Edmundoa lindenii is a plant species in the genus Edmundoa. This species is endemic to Brazil.

References

lindenii
Flora of Brazil